XHSB-FM is a radio station on 94.9 FM in Santa Bárbara, Chihuahua, serving Hidalgo del Parral. It is owned by Grupo Radiorama and carries its Arroba FM and Éxtasis Digital formats.

History
XESB-AM on 820 kHz received its concession on June 18, 1947. The Santa Bárbara-based station was owned by Domingo Salayandia Nájera and predated his other station, XEGD, by five years.

After Salayandia's death, his successors sold the concession to Radio Santa Bárbara, a business of Arnoldo Rodríguez Zermeño, in 2004. Zermeño ultimately sold his Chihuahua stations to Radiorama. Prior to migrating to FM, the AM station had changed frequencies to 810 kHz.

As a result of the expiration of the concession of XHHHI-FM 99.3, Arroba FM moved to XHSB, sharing time with the existing Éxtasis Digital format, on July 1, 2019. In February 2022, the station switched to a full-time Éxtasis Digital format.

References

External links
Radiorama Parral

Radio stations in Chihuahua